San Francisco de Ojuera is a municipality in the Honduran department of Santa Bárbara.

Demographics
At the time of the 2013 Honduras census, San Francisco de Ojuera municipality had a population of 7,000. Of these, 95.79% were Mestizo, 2.27% White, 1.41% Indigenous (0.97% Lenca, 0.34% Nahua), 0.51% Black or Afro-Honduran and 0.01% others.

References

Municipalities of the Santa Bárbara Department, Honduras